Anthony Cope may refer to:
 Anthony Cope (author) (died 1551), English author
 Anthony Cope (Dean of Armagh) (1713–1764)
 Anthony Cope (Dean of Elphin) (died 1705)
 Sir Anthony Cope, 1st Baronet (1548?–1614), English Member of Parliament
 Sir Anthony Cope, 4th Baronet (1632–1675), MP for Banbury and Oxfordshire
 Sir Anthony Cope, 13th Baronet (1842–1932), of the Cope baronets
 Sir Anthony Mohun Leckonby Cope, 15th Baronet (1927–1966), of the Cope baronets
 Anthony Trevor Cope, professor of Zulu

See also
 Cope (surname)